Villivakkam railway station is a railway station on the Chennai Central–Arakkonam section of the Chennai Suburban Railway Network a city of Chennai in India. Located 9 km from Chennai Central railway station, the station serves the neighbourhood of Villivakkam, Kolathur and Padi. It has an elevation of 10.25 m above sea level.

History

The first lines in the station were electrified on 29 November 1979, with the electrification of the Chennai Central–Tiruvallur section. Additional lines at the station were electrified on 2 October 1986, with the electrification of the Villivakkam–Avadi section.

Facilities
The station has a foot overbridge for pedestrian, a level crossing and a vehicular subway. The vehicular subway, whose construction was started on 4 December 2007 and which replaced the previous level crossing 2 (LC2), was opened to traffic on 19 June 2012 and is located on the western side of the station. The 447.50-m-long subway linking north Villivakkam with south Villivakkam was built at a cost of  390 million, which also has a 2.5-m-wide bicycle lane. The level crossing 1 (LC1), located at the eastern side of the station (between Villivakkam and Perambur Loco Works stations), is being replaced with a 460-meter-long road overbridge being built at a cost of  590 million. The level crossing is located adjacent to the Integral Coach Factory (ICF) and connects several residential areas in both Villivakkam and Kolathur. The road overbridge will be 8.5 meters wide (with a carriageway of 7.5 meters) and will have 11 pillars. The bridge connects East Seeyalam Street with Villivakkam East Railway Crossing Road in Kumaran Nagar.

About 900 tickets are issued every day at the station, of which 400 are from the northern side. In 2002, a ticket counter was opened on the northern side. However, it was closed down in 2005 owing to low patronage.

Demographics
The nearby Kolathur area has around 500,000 people residing in 54 colonies, and about 25,000 people are daily using the service of Chennai suburban railway trains. As of 2013, the station handles about 32,000 passengers a day.

See also

 Chennai Suburban Railway
 Integral Coach Factory
 Regional Railway Museum
 Railway stations in Chennai

References

External links

 Villivakkam station at Indiarailinfo.com

Stations of Chennai Suburban Railway
Railway stations in Chennai